Silver Threads Among the Gold is a 1915 American silent film starring countertenor Richard Jose. In the film, Jose performs the popular song Silver Threads Among the Gold. The six-reel film was produced by Pierce Kingsley and R. R. Roberts for the K & R film Company.

The film was unusual for the time, as each exhibition hired a performer to sing live in the wings, in a reversal of lip-synch.

This film was also the earliest known "talkie" film.

Cast
Guy D'Ennery as Tom
Dora Dean as Mary Chester
Mrs. R.E. French as Martin's wife
Richard J. Jose as Martin
Dick Lee
Jane Lee
Katherine Lee (credited as Catherine Lee)
Jim McCabe
Jack Ridgeway as Judge Walcott (credited as Jack Ridgway)

References

External links

1915 films
American silent feature films
Films based on songs
1915 drama films
Silent American drama films
American black-and-white films
Films directed by Pierce Kingsley
1910s American films